State Route 145 (SR 145) is a  state highway that runs southeast-to-northwest through portions of Franklin and Stephens counties in the northeastern part of the U.S. state of Georgia. The route connects Franklin Springs with Toccoa.

Route description
SR 145 begins at an intersection with U.S. Route 29 (US 29)/SR 8 (West Main Street) in Franklin Springs, in Franklin County. The route heads west-northwest to cross the North Fork Broad River and to reach an intersection with SR 51. The two routes run concurrently to the north-northwest. SR 145 splits to the northwest and reaches Carnesville. For just under , SR 59/SR 106/SR 145 run concurrently to the northeast. Immediately after SR 59 departs, SR 106/SR 145 reach an interchange with Interstate 85 (I-85). Farther to the north, SR 145 departs and crosses over the North Fork Broad River again. The highway continues to the northwest and enters Stephens County. Northwest of Eastanollee is an intersection with SR 17. Just southeast of Toccoa, SR 145 meets its northern terminus, an intersection with SR 63/SR 106 (Mize Road).

SR 145 is not part of the National Highway System.

Major intersections

See also

References

External links

 Georgia Roads (Routes 141 - 160)

145
Transportation in Franklin County, Georgia
Transportation in Stephens County, Georgia